Clay Cross Town Football Club is an English football club based in Clay Cross, Derbyshire.

History
Formed in 1989 as Parkhouse F.C., the club joined the Central Midlands Football League in 2007. They won promotion from the Premier Division to the Supreme Division in 2010, and upon the league's restructuring a year later were placed in the North Division.

In the summer of 2012 the club was renamed Clay Cross Town F.C., meaning they would be the third club to take such a name - the first and second had both played in the FA Cup over a century earlier.

In 2016, the club made its debut in the FA Vase.
On 8 November 2016 the newly formed club reached the third round of the Derbyshire Senior Cup Competition for the first time after beating Pinxton  at Mill Lane 5–2. The third-round tie played on 6 December 2016 saw them host Evo-Stik club Buxton. Before a crowd of 150 the Millers lost 2–1 to the Bucks.

References

External links
 Home Official website

Association football clubs established in 1993
Football clubs in England
Football clubs in Derbyshire
1993 establishments in England
Central Midlands Football League
Midlands Regional Alliance